During the 1952–53 season Derby County competed in the Football League First Division where they finished in 22nd position with 32 points and were relegated to the Second Division along with Stoke City whom Derby beat 2–1 in the penultimate match of the season sending Stoke down.

Final league table

First Division

Key: P = Matches played; W = Matches won; D = Matches drawn; L = Matches lost; F = Goals for; A = Goals against; GA = Goal average; Pts = Points

Results

Legend

Football League First Division

FA Cup

References
 1952–53 Derby County season at Statto.com
 1952–53 Derby County season at Soccerway.com (use drop down list to select relevant season)

External links

Derby County F.C. seasons
Derby County